Aromanian may refer to:

Aromanians, an ethnic group native to the Balkans
Aromanians in Albania
Aromanians in Bulgaria
Aromanians in Greece
Aromanians in North Macedonia
Aromanians in Romania
Aromanians in Serbia
Aromanian language, their language, part of the Eastern Romance family
Aromanian settlements, in the Balkans

Language and nationality disambiguation pages